Human Touch is the ninth studio album by American singer-songwriter Bruce Springsteen. The album was released on March 31, 1992, the same day as Lucky Town. It was the more popular of the two, peaking at number two on the US Billboard 200, with "Human Touch" (paired with Lucky Towns "Better Days") peaking at number one on the Mainstream Rock chart and number 16 on the Billboard Hot 100 chart. "Human Touch" has since sold more than one million copies in the United States, and was nominated for Best Rock Vocal Performance at the 1993 Grammy Awards.

Background
Not long after Springsteen broke up the E Street Band in October 1989, pianist Roy Bittan played Springsteen three instrumental songs he had written: "Roll of the Dice", "Real World" and "Trouble in Paradise". Springsteen later added lyrics to the songs, and liked them to the point where he began writing and recording more songs. With the E Street Band gone—except for Bittan, who played keyboards and co-produced the album—Springsteen assembled a band of studio musicians in Los Angeles, mostly using the services of Randy Jackson on bass guitar and Jeff Porcaro on drums. A wide variety of background vocalists were used, including Sam Moore, Bobby Hatfield, and Bobby King. Overall, at least 25 or so songs were recorded, but the exact number is unknown.

The album was originally set for a spring-summer 1991 release date, having been pushed back from early 1991, but was once again halted when Springsteen began recording Lucky Town later that year. Springsteen ultimately decided to release both albums on the same day, with Human Touch released on March 31, 1992—more than two years after starting the project.

Porcaro was asked by Springsteen to join the band for the subsequent tour, but declined because he was engaged with his own band Toto. Porcaro died a few months later of a heart attack in his garden.

Critical reception

Human Touch debuted and peaked at No. 2 on the Billboard 200 selling 246,000 copies during its first week. The album was met with a generally mixed critical reception. Rolling Stone gave the album 4 stars and noted that the songs "explore the movement from disenchanted isolation to a willingness to risk love and its attendant traumas again." The review also stated that the title track "stands among Springsteen's best work." However Bill Wyman of The Chicago Reader gave the album a very harsh review, calling it "the worst piece of [expletive] you can imagine coming from a talent on Springsteen's level." Out of the album's 14 tracks, Wyman said there was only "one passable Springsteen song, 'The Long Goodbye.' The lyrics don't make much sense...but it has a bruising musical onslaught that covers up a lot."

Though his initial review was more positive, Greg Kot of The Chicago Tribune later wrote that "in retrospect, Human Touch tried to re-create the stadium-rocking aura of an E Street album, with session musicians unsuccessfully replacing the road-tested band." AllMusic later described the album as "generic pop" and "his first that didn't at least aspire to greatness."

The album is generally disliked by Springsteen fans, and in 2012 was ranked last among Springsteen's albums by the online magazine Nerve. Regarding the bad reputation of Human Touch and Lucky Town among his fans, Springsteen said: "I tried it [writing happy songs] in the early '90s and it didn't work; the public didn't like it."

Track listing
All music and lyrics by Bruce Springsteen, except where noted

Unreleased outtakes
Springsteen's first album without the E Street Band featured numerous outtakes, many of which have been released. A cover of "Viva Las Vegas" was released as a B-side and on The Essential Bruce Springsteen, "Chicken Lips and Lizard Hips" was released on a children's album, and "30 Days Out" was also a B-side. "Part Man, Part Monkey", a track originally recorded during the Tunnel of Love session and performed on that tour, was re-recorded and released as a B-side and on Tracks along with other outtakes such as "Trouble In Paradise", "Sad Eyes", "Leavin' Train", "Seven Angels", "My Lover Man", "When the Lights Go Out", "Over the Rise", "Goin' Cali" and "Loose Change". "Trouble River" was released on 18 Tracks. Springsteen also recorded "Red-Headed Woman", a tribute to his wife Patti Scialfa and a song performed often, eventually released as a live version on the MTV Unplugged album, "Secret Garden", which would later get re-worked with the reunited E Street Band in 1995 for Greatest Hits, and "All the Way Home", a song Springsteen gave to Southside Johnny and one that Springsteen would not release until 2005's Devils & Dust.

"Red Headed Woman"
"Secret Garden"
"All the Way Home"

Personnel
 Bruce Springsteen – guitar and lead vocals, bass guitar on "57 Channels (And Nothin' On)"Additional Musicians Randy Jackson – bass guitar
 Jeff Porcaro – drums, percussion
 Roy Bittan – keyboards
 Sam Moore – harmony vocals on "Soul Driver", "Real World" and "Man's Job"
 Patti Scialfa – harmony vocals on "Human Touch" and "Pony Boy"
 David Sancious – Hammond organ on "Soul Driver" and "Real Man"
 Bobby King – backing vocals on "Roll of the Dice" and "Man's Job"
 Tim Pierce – second guitar on "Soul Driver" and "Roll of the Dice"
 Michael Fisher – percussion on "Soul Driver"
 Bobby Hatfield – harmony vocals on "I Wish I Were Blind"
 Mark Isham – muted trumpet on "With Every Wish"
 Douglas Lunn – fretless bass guitar nonpareil on "With Every Wish"
Kurt Wortman – drums and dumbeck on "With Every Wish"Technical: Bruce Springsteen, Jon Landau, Chuck Plotkin, Roy Bittan – production
 Toby Scott – engineering
 Robert "RJ" Jaczko – additional engineering and assistant engineering
 Greg Goldman, Randy Wine, Tom Hardisty, Clif Norrell, Craig Johnson, Buzz Burrows – assistant engineering
 Bob Clearmountain – mixing
 Bob Ludwig – mastering
 Scott Hull, Dave Collins – digital editing
 Sandra Choron – art direction
 Victor Weaver – typography design
 David Rose – cover photography, interior photography
 Annie Leibovitz, Harvy Gruyaert – interior photography

Singles

Singles were released in both U.S. and UK/Europe, unless otherwise indicated:
A^' Charted as double A-Side with "Better Days" when released in the United States.

Charts

Weekly charts

Year-end charts

Certifications

References

External links
 
 Audio and lyrics

Bruce Springsteen albums
1992 albums
Albums produced by Jon Landau
Albums produced by Chuck Plotkin
Albums produced by Roy Bittan
Columbia Records albums
Albums recorded at A&M Studios